Ignazio Prota (15 September 1690 – January 1748) was an Italian composer and music educator. He was the father of composer Tommaso Prota and the grandfather of composer Gabriele Prota.

Prota was born and died in Naples.  He taught for many years at the Conservatorio di Sant'Onofrio a Porta Capuana in Naples where two of his students were composers Matteo Capranica and Niccolò Jommelli.  He wrote mainly sacred music and produced 3 operas.

Operas
 La finta fattucchiera (opera buffa, libretto by Angelo Birini), Spring 1721, Naples, Teatro dei Fiorentini)
La vedova ingegnosa (intermezzi, libretto by Tommaso Mariani, 12 July 1735, Naples, Teatro S. Bartolomeo)
La camilla (opera buffa, libretto by Antonio Palomba, 1737, Naples, Teatro Nuovo)

References

1690 births
1748 deaths
Italian classical composers
Italian male classical composers
Italian opera composers
Male opera composers